Kaj Andersen may refer to:

 Kaj Andersen (athlete) (1943–1973), Danish discus thrower
 Kaj Andersen (badmintonner)